This is a list of things named after Tadeusz Kościuszko, in his commemoration.

Places

Australia 
 Kosciuszko National Park, New South Wales
 Mount Kosciuszko, the highest mountain in Australia (not including its external territories)

United States 
 Kosciusko, Mississippi
 Kosciusko, St. Louis, Missouri
 Kosciusko, Texas
 Kosciusko County, Indiana
 Kosciusko Island, Alaska

Buildings, structures, and monuments

Poland 
 Tadeusz Kościuszko Monument, Kraków
 Kościuszko Mound, Kraków
 Kościuszko Park, Katowice

United States

 Kosciuszko's Monument (West Point)
 Kosciuszko Monument, Milwaukee
 Kosciuszko Park, Milwaukee
 Kosciuszko's Garden, West Point, New York
 Kosciuszko Bridge, New York City
 Thaddeus Kosciusko Bridge in Halfmoon and Colonie, New York
 Thaddeus Kosciuszko National Memorial in Philadelphia, Pennsylvania
 Kosciuszko Park (Chicago)
 Kosciuszko Street in Brooklyn, New York, its accompanying station on the New York City Subway, and the nearby Kosciuszko Pool.
 Kosciusko Street in Rochester, New York
 Kosciusko Way in Pittsburgh, Pennsylvania
 General Thaddeus Kosciuszko Way in Los Angeles, California
 Kosciuszko Street in the International Polish Village Toledo, Ohio
 Thaddeus Kosciuszko Circle, Boston, Massachusetts
 Thaddeus Kosciuszko Park, Dublin, Ohio
 Thaddeus Kosciuszko Statue in the Public Garden, Boston, Massachusetts
 Kosciuszko Monument, Williams Park, St. Petersburg, FL
 Washington-Kosciuszko Elementary School, Winona, Minnesota
 Kosciuszko Street in Nanticoke, Pennsylvania
 Kosciuszko Park in Stamford, Connecticut
 Thaddeus Kosciuszko Highway in New Britain, Connecticut
 Kosciuszko Park in Wilmington, Delaware

Hungary 
 Tadeusz Kościuszko Street, Budapest

Brazil 
 Tadeu Kosciusco Street, Rio de Janeiro

Serbia 
 Tadeuša Košćuška Street, Belgrade
Russia

 Kosciuszko street in Saint Petersburg, Russia

Organizations
 Kosciuszko Foundation
 Tadeusz Kościuszko University of Technology
 The Kosciuszko Institute
 The Kosciuszko Chair of Polish Studies at The Institute of World Politics

Military organizations 
 Kościuszko's Squadron, a Polish fighter squadron in the Polish-Soviet War of 1919–1921
 No. 303 Polish Fighter Squadron, known as the No. 303 "Kościuszko", was a Second World War Polish fighter squadron
 Polish 1st Tadeusz Kościuszko Infantry Division, a Second World War unit, part of the 1st Polish Army
 Polish 111th Fighter Escadrille, known as Kościuszko's squadron, was a Polish fighter squadron in the Invasion of Poland of 1939
 Tadeusz Kościuszko Land Forces Military Academy in Wrocław, Poland

Ships 
 , a Polish Navy guided missile frigate
 SS Kościuszko, a Polish ocean liner

Airliners 
 When LOT Polish Airlines used Ilyushin Il-62s and Il-62Ms. 2 of them were named after Kościuszko. One of these (SP-LBG) tragically crashed on 9 May 1987, killing 183 people.

References

See also 
LOT Polish Airlines Flight 5055. The plane that crashed was named Tadeusz Kosciuszko.

List
Kosciuszko, Tadeusz